Viktor Oleksandrovych Aristov (14 August 1938 – 14 February 2023) was a Ukrainian football coach and player.

References

External links
  Тренери України часів незалежності. Чемпіонства «Дніпро» позбавив Віктор Аристов
 Viktor Aristov at FootballFacts.ru (in Russian)
  Віктор Арістов: «Замислююсь над тим, щоб написати мемуари»

1938 births
2023 deaths
People from Mikhaylovsky District, Ryazan Oblast
Russian emigrants to Ukraine
Sportspeople from Ryazan Oblast
Soviet footballers
Association football forwards
Association football defenders
FC Volgar Astrakhan players
FC Energiya Volzhsky players
SC Tavriya Simferopol players
FC Metalist Kharkiv players
FC Nyva Vinnytsia players
Ukrainian football managers
Soviet football managers
Ukrainian Premier League managers
FC Metalist Kharkiv managers
FC Ahrotekhservis Sumy managers
FC Zorya Luhansk managers
FC Luch Vladivostok managers